Richard Manning is an environmental author and journalist.

Richard Manning may also refer to:

 Richard Manning (born 1947), an English freelance illustrator that worked for Hipgnosis
 Rich Manning (born 1970), American basketball player
 Rick Manning (born 1954), American baseball player
 Ricky Manning (born 1980), American football cornerback
 Brennan Manning (Richard Francis Xavier Manning, 1934–2013), American Roman Catholic priest
 Richard Irvine Manning I (1789–1836), American politician
 Richard Irvine Manning III (1859–1931), American politician
 Richard C. Manning, Australian development expert

See also
 Dick Manning (1912–1991), Russian-American songwriter
 Richard Manning Jefferies (1888–1964), American politician